Thomas W. Kates (May 7, 1861 – May 6, 1931) was an American Private serving in the United States Marine Corps during the Boxer Rebellion who received the Medal of Honor for bravery.

Biography
Kates was born May 7, 1861, in Shelby Center, New York and enlisted into the marine corps from the Marine Barracks in New York on July 21, 1899. After entering the Marine Corps he was sent to fight in the Chinese Boxer Rebellion.

He received his Medal for his actions in Tientsin, China June 21, 1900 and the medal was presented to him on July 19, 1901.

He was discharged from the marine corps May 19, 1903 in Brooklyn, New York.

Medal of Honor citation
Rank and organization: Private, U.S. Marine Corps. Born: 7 May 1865, Shelby Center, N.Y. Accredited to: New York. G.O. No.: 55, 19 July 1901.

Citation:

In the presence of the enemy during the advance on Tientsin, China, 21 June 1900, Kates distinguished himself by meritorious conduct.

See also

List of Medal of Honor recipients
List of Medal of Honor recipients for the Boxer Rebellion

References

External links

1865 births
United States Marine Corps Medal of Honor recipients
United States Marines
American military personnel of the Boxer Rebellion
People from Shelby, New York
1931 deaths
Boxer Rebellion recipients of the Medal of Honor